The Tenterfield Oration was a speech given by Sir Henry Parkes, Premier of the Colony of New South Wales at the Tenterfield School of Arts in Tenterfield, in rural New South Wales, Australia, on 24 October 1889. In the Oration, Parkes called for the Federation of the six Australian colonies, which were at the time self-governing but under the distant central authority of the British Colonial Secretary. The speech is considered to be the start of the federation process in Australia, which led to the foundation of the Commonwealth of Australia 12 years later.

Background
The north of New South Wales suffered from the disunited administration, as it was distant from the colony's capital of Sydney but closer to commercial areas across the border,  in Queensland. Border importation tariffs were imposed by Queensland, and people in neighbouring districts were strongly in favour of free trade.

The primary reason given by Premier Parkes for federation in the Tenterfield Oration was the united defence of the Australian continent. In a 1999 address, Bob Carr (premier of NSW 1995–2005) compared the Tenterfield Oration's significance for Australia with that of Abraham Lincoln's Gettysburg Address in America.

At Tenterfield, Parkes urged the seven colonies (the seventh being the Colony of New Zealand) to 'unite and create a great national government for all Australia'. He explicitly stated the inspiration that the United States should hold for Australians in terms of its gaining any independence from the British. This sentiment struck a chord with colonials. Due to the widespread publication of this speech in Australian newspapers, and due also to Parkes' subsequent roles in petitioning the Queen and in drafting the constitution, he is regarded as the "father of federation". The site of the Tenterfield Oration was commemorated by the Commonwealth Governor General in 1946.

Prompted by Parkes' Tenterfield Oration, the colonies agreed to send delegates to Melbourne in 1890 for a Constitutional Conference. That set in motion the process of writing and adopting the Commonwealth Constitution over the course of the 1890s, resulting in the union of the colonies and the establishment of a system of federalism in Australia.

The Speech 

The speech referred to the Parliament of New South Wales and the Parliament of Queensland, and quoted the poem The Dominion by James Brunton Stephens:

See also 
 Canadian Confederation
 Articles of Confederation (United States)

References

1889 in Australia
1880s speeches